Jens Jacob Lapidus (born 24 May 1974) is a Swedish criminal defense lawyer and author known for his books about the Stockholm underworld.

Life and career
Lapidus was born into a middle class family in the Stockholm suburb Gröndal, with a mother who was a social worker. His family is Jewish. As a young man he was active in the Stureplan party scene, which plays a role in his novels. He made his writing debut in August 2006 with Easy Money, an account of the Stockholm underworld, and the first of the Stockholm Noir trilogy. Two years later the second installment Aldrig fucka upp was published by Wahlström & Widstrand.  A graphic novel with illustrator Peter Bergting (The Portent) entitled Gängkrig 145 was published in May 2009. While this project does take place in the same universe as the novels, it is not the third part of the Stockholm Noir trilogy but rather a side story. The third part was published in 2011 with the title Livet deluxe. In 2014 Lapidus published the novel VIP-rummet which is the start of a new series unrelated to his Stockholm Noir trilogy. The second part STHLM Delete was published in 2015. His writing has been compared to James Ellroy and Dennis Lehane. The Stockholm Noir trilogy has also been adapted into a Swedish trilogy of films: Easy Money (2010), Easy Money II: Hard to Kill (2012), and Easy Money III: Life Deluxe (2013). And in 2021 into a Netflix series, Snabba Cash which takes place ten years after the film trilogy. The third part Top Dog in the new series was published in 2017 (in English in 2018). Together with two others Lapidus has written the TV-series Advokaten.

Lapidus has also together with his wife Hedda published a series of children's books, Dillstaligan.

Jens Lapidus lives in Stockholm with his wife, Hedda, one daughter and two sons.

Lapidus also does some modelling work and has among others represented Cartier.

Lapidus is a legal expert at TV4 TV-channel commenting on crime and legal issues.

Bibliography

Novels

The Stockholm Noir trilogy
Snabba cash (2006) (English publication: "Easy Money")
Aldrig fucka upp (2008) (English publication: "Never Fuck Up"/ "Never Screw Up")
Livet deluxe (2011) (English publication: "Life Deluxe")

New series
VIP-rummet (2014) (English Translation: "VIP-room")
STHLM Delete (2015) (English Translation: "Stockholm delete")
Topp dogg (2017) (English Translation: "Top dog")

Other novels
 Paradis City (2021) Set in a dystopian version Scandinavia
 Mr Ett (2022) fourth book about Emelie and Teddy (Top Dogg trilogy)

Graphic Novel
Gängkrig 145 (2009) (English Translation: "Gang War 145")

Short story collection
Mamma försökte (2012) (English Translation: "Mama Tried")

References

External links
 Jens Lapidus' Swedish website
 Jens Lapidus on Facebook
 Jens Lapidus on The Salomonsson Agency (literary agents)

1974 births
Living people
Writers from Stockholm
Swedish crime fiction writers
20th-century Swedish lawyers
Swedish Jews
Swedish male models
Nordic Noir writers
21st-century Swedish lawyers